Gothamie Weerakoon is a Sri Lankan-based botanist, lichenologist and environmentalist.

Early life and education 
After completing her primary education at the Devi Balika Vidyalaya in Colombo, she attended the University of Colombo, completing her PhD in 2013 at the Sri Jayawardenepura University. She emerged as the most active Sri Lankan lichen researcher.

Career 
She has conducted research on South Asian lichens, discovering over 100 new species endemic to Sri Lanka. Some of the species she has discovered include Heterodermia queesnberryi and Polymeridium fernandoi. In 2015, she wrote Fascinating Lichens of Sri Lanka, which provides facts about lichen species endemic to Sri Lanka. She currently works as the senior curator of Lichens and Slime Moulds at the Natural History Museum of London and also with tea brand, Dilmah.

Awards and recognition 
She is the first South Asian woman scientist to hold the Annual Grantee award from the National Geographic Society.

See also
 :Category:Taxa named by Gothamie Weerakoon

References 

Living people
Date of birth missing (living people)
Sri Lankan botanists
Sri Lankan scientists
Sri Lankan environmentalists
Lichenologists
Alumni of Holy Family Convent, Kurunegala
People from Kurunegala
Sri Lankan expatriates in the United Kingdom
1973 births
Sri Lankan women environmentalists
Women lichenologists